The Diocese of Norwich St Benet's Multi-Academy Trust is a multi-academy trust, serving schools in the Diocese of Norwich, in Norfolk and the Waveney Valley. These are predominantly former Church of England village primary schools.

Primary academies
  Diss Church of England Junior Academy
  Dickleburgh Church of England Primary Academy
 Diss Infant Academy and Nursery

All-through academies
Harleston Sancroft Academy, Harleston, Norfolk

References

Multi-academy trusts
Education in Norfolk
Education in Suffolk